Auzances (Auvergnat: Ausança) is a commune in the Creuse department in the Nouvelle-Aquitaine region in central France.

Geography
The commune is served by local coaches.

Population

Sights
 Considerable evidence of Roman occupation: villas and tombs,
 The church of St.Jacques, dating from the thirteenth century.
 Several watermills.
 The seventeenth century Montpensier house, with 2 towers.
 The sixteenth century chapel  of Sainte-Anne.
 The seventeenth century chapel of Sainte-Marguerite.

Personalities
Jean Taillandier, professional footballer, was born here in 1938.
Jean Beaufret (1907–1982), philosopher, was born here.

International relations
The following towns are twinned with Auzances :
 Roßtal, Germany
 Sainte-Cécile-les-Vignes, France

See also
Communes of the Creuse department

References

External links

 Official website of the commune 

Communes of Creuse
County of La Marche